The current Anthony Public Library is located at 624 E. Main Street in Anthony, Kansas.

Its former building located at 104 N. Springfield in Anthony, Kansas, is a Carnegie library which was built in 1911. It was listed on the National Register of Historic Places in 1987 as "Anthony Public (Carnegie) Library". It was funded by a $10,000 Carnegie grant received in 1908.

References

Libraries on the National Register of Historic Places in Kansas
Tudor Revival architecture in the United States
Library buildings completed in 1911
Harper County, Kansas
Carnegie libraries in Kansas